

Abia
Aba Mega Mall (opened May 27, 2015) -  set to be the biggest mall in Africa; has the unique distinction of being the first and only smart mall in the world; Phase one was commissioned by former Governor Theodore Orji

Enugu
 Polo Park Mall (opened on September 15, 2011)

FCT
 Silverbird Entertainment Centre (opened in 2009)

Kano
 Ado Bayero Mall (opened on March 20, 2014) - developed by the Alpine Group of Africa; would be the largest mall in Northern Nigeria; will be managed by Beyond Squarefeet.

Lagos

 Ikeja City Mall
 Palms Shopping Mall

See also 
 List of largest shopping malls in Nigeria
 List of largest shopping malls in the world

References

Nigeria
Shopping malls